The 34th Golden Disc Awards ceremony was held from January 4–5, 2020. The JTBC network broadcast the show from the Gocheok Sky Dome in Seoul. Lee Da-hee and Sung Si-kyung served as hosts on the first day, with Lee Seung-gi and Park So-dam on the second.

Criteria
The first part of this two-day award ceremony highlighted the biggest digital releases in 2019. The second part, taking place on January 5,  recognised achievements in the category of physical album releases. Fans cast their votes for the 'Popularity Award', which was 100% determined by online votes via TikTok. Voting for the 'Fan's Choice K-Pop Star' award took place via Chinese music streaming platforms.

Winners and nominees
Winners are listed first in alphabetical order and emphasized in bold.

The following is the list of winners:

Genre & Other Awards

References

2020 in South Korean music
2020 music awards
Golden Disc Awards ceremonies